The Israel Festival is a multidisciplinary arts festival held every spring in Israel. Its center is Jerusalem. The festival operates as a non-profit organization. Some of the shows are offered free. Street performances and special performances for children are also part of the festival.

History 
The Israel Festival started in 1961 as a summer festival for classical music in the ancient Roman theater in Caesarea. Throughout the years the festival grew in the number of art disciplines and activity centers with recent festivals including classical music, ballet, jazz, theater, visual arts and lectures, combining high quality programs from Israel and abroad. From 1982 onwards the Israel Festival was adopted by the City of Jerusalem and most shows are held within its boundaries.

The first festivals were directed by Zvi Propes. Yossi Tal-Gan served as the director of the festival from 1992 till 2014. While the festival's quality were widely recognized, there had been complaints about the high entrance fees to the performances.

Since 2014, General Director Eyal Sher and Artistic Director Itzik Giuli have led the festival. Dan Halperin heads the public board.

See also
Culture of Israel
Music of Israel
Israeli dance
Theater of Israel

References

 Looking back, looking forward: The 2018 Israel Festival 
 Art and Culture in Jerusalem:  Celebrating Diversity Over Divisiveness 
 Amid coronavirus crisis, Israel Festival to adapt and move forward

External links
 Official website 

Festivals in Jerusalem
Spring festivals
Tourist attractions in Jerusalem
Annual events in Israel
Classical music festivals in Israel
Music festivals established in 1961